The Boia Mare is a left tributary of the river Olt in Romania. Its source is in the Făgăraș Mountains. It discharges into the Olt in Greblești.

References

Rivers of Romania
Rivers of Vâlcea County